Mehul Buch is an Indian actor who works in Hindi and Gujarati stage, film and television productions.

Personal life
He is married to Alpana Buch, an actress, and has a daughter, Bhavya.

Filmography

Hindi Films

Gujarati Films

Television

Web series

References

External links
 

Indian male stage actors
Indian male film actors
Gujarati theatre
Hindi theatre
Gujarati people
Year of birth missing (living people)
Living people
Place of birth missing (living people)